Roberto Massimo (born 12 October 2000) is a professional footballer who plays as a forward for Liga Portugal 2 club Académico de Viseu, on loan from Bundesliga club VfB Stuttgart. Born in Ghana, he has represented Germany at youth level.

Club career
Massimo made 18 appearances for Arminia Bielefeld's U-17 team and played seven games for the first team. In May 2018, Massimo signed a contract with Bundesliga side VfB Stuttgart, but initially remained on loan at Bielefeld until 30 June 2019.

On 22 July 2022, Massimo joined Académico de Viseu in Portugal on loan for the 2022–23 season.

International career
Massimo was born in Ghana to a Liberian mother and an Italian father. He was raised in Germany and is a German citizen. Massimo is a youth international for the Germany U18s.

References

External links
 
 

2000 births
Living people
Footballers from Accra
German footballers
Germany youth international footballers
Germany under-21 international footballers
German people of Italian descent
German people of Liberian descent
Sportspeople of Liberian descent
Naturalized citizens of Germany
Association football forwards
Arminia Bielefeld players
VfB Stuttgart players
Académico de Viseu F.C. players
Bundesliga players
2. Bundesliga players
German expatriate footballers
Expatriate footballers in Portugal
German expatriate sportspeople in Portugal

Ghanaian people of Italian descent